Alexander Hosie, may refer to:

Alec Hosie, English cricketer
Alexander Hosie (diplomat), Scottish diplomat and botanical collector